RAF Heathfield, sometimes known as RAF Ayr/Heathfield due to its proximity to Glasgow Prestwick Airport, which was also used by military flights, is a former Royal Air Force station.

Like many other wartime airfields, its runways were of the triangular layout.

History

Royal Air Force use
The following units were posted here at some point:

Units

Royal Navy use
On 6 September 1944 Heathfield was handed over to the Royal Navy and was designated as HMS Wagtail.  One runway was redesigned and used by the Royal Navy's Fleet Air Arm to practice aircraft carrier landings.

The following units were posted here at some point:

The site was used by the United States Air Force between 1951 and 1957 for storage.

Current use

The site is now a mixture of housing, farmland and a golf club.

See also
 List of former Royal Air Force stations

References

Citations

Bibliography
 Berry, P (2005) Prestwick Airport and Scottish Aviation

RAF Ayr entry at Air of Authority – A History of RAF Organisation
Ayr (HMS Wagtail) entry in Index of Naval Air Stations

Royal Air Force stations of World War II in the United Kingdom
Royal Air Force stations in Scotland
Royal Air Force stations in Ayrshire
Buildings and structures in South Ayrshire
Defunct airports in Scotland